Bernard Cairns (born 14 December 1928) was a Scottish footballer who played for Airdrie and Dumbarton. He played in Canada in 1958 for AC Sparta Toronto in the National Soccer League. In 1960, he was selected for the NSL All-Star team. In 1961, he played in the Eastern Canada Professional Soccer League with Toronto City FC.

References

1928 births
Possibly living people
Place of birth missing (living people)
Scottish footballers
Dumbarton F.C. players
Airdrieonians F.C. (1878) players
Toronto Roma players
Toronto City players
Scottish Football League players
Canadian National Soccer League players
Eastern Canada Professional Soccer League players
Association football wing halves